Tale of the Greenlanders may refer to:

Grœnlendinga saga
Grœnlendinga þáttr (I)
Grœnlendinga þáttr (II)/Einars þáttr Sokkasonar